Mera Dharam (My Religion) is a 1986 Indian Bollywood film directed by Bapu and produced by Ratan Irani. It stars Jackie Shroff, Amrita Singh in pivotal roles. The music was composed by Bappi Lahiri.

Cast

 Jackie Shroff as Jai Singh Sengar
 Amrita Singh as Durga Singh
 Shakti Kapoor as Bhanwar Singh Danga
 Romesh Sharma as Vishal Singh Sengar
 Aruna Irani as Mrs. Vishal Singh Sengar
 Pradeep Kumar as Hari Singh Sengar
 Bharat Bhushan as Baba
 Sharat Saxena as Chana
 Sudhir Pandey as Sewaram Tiwari
 Amrish Puri as Thakur Digvijay Singh

Soundtrack
All songs are written by Hasan Kamal. The soundtrack is available on Polydor (now called Universal Music Group).

References

External links

1980s Hindi-language films
1986 films
Films directed by Bapu
Films scored by Bappi Lahiri